Maxim Ivanov may refer to:

Maxim Ivanov (politician, born 1967), Russian politician
Maxim Ivanov (politician, born 1987), Russian politician

  (born 1974), Russian musician
  (born 1979), Estonian ice hockey player
  (born 1993), Russian sambist